Taylor Townsend was the defending champion, but chose not to participate.

Madison Brengle won the title, defeating Caroline Dolehide in the final, 6–4, 6–3.

Seeds

Draw

Finals

Top half

Bottom half

References
Main Draw

Boyd Tinsley Women's Clay Court Classic - Singles